Myrtle Station is a community in the Town of Whitby, Durham Region, Ontario, Canada.

Myrtle Station is located approximately one kilometre north of the community of Myrtle. In 1884, the Canadian Pacific Railway (CPR) built a rail line between Toronto and Montreal through the area. A railway station was constructed and the community that grew in the vicinity was known as Myrtle Station. The community was originally part of Whitby Township and became part of the Town of Whitby when the two municipalities amalgamated in 1968. From 1994 until 2004 Myrtle Station hosted the annual Grasstock music and arts festival.

The CPR line remains, but now ends in Havelock-Belmont-Methuen.

References
 Commemorating 100 Years of Peace, Plenty, Progress in the County of Ontario. 1955.

External links 
 Historic Photos of Myrtle Station, Ontario at Whitby Public Library and Archives Digital Collection
Myrtle Station at Geographical Names of Canada

Neighbourhoods in Whitby, Ontario